The  W. H. Kiblinger Company and the W. H. McIntyre Company produced Brass Era automobiles in Auburn, Indiana from 1907 to 1915.

History

Kiblinger 
The W. H. Kiblinger Company formed in 1887, manufactured buggies.  After W. H. Kiblinger's death in 1894, William H. McIntyre co-purchased the company and began experimenting with automobiles as early as 1897.  In 1907 Kiblinger began selling high-wheelers with tiller steering and two-cylinder air-cooled engines as the Kiblinger.  Prices started at $250, which the company claimed was the "lowest price successful automobile on the road'

The company grew to occupy a total of five buildings around Auburn, Indiana and employed 400 men.  After producing a few hundred Kiblingers, the company building the Success high-wheeler sued Kiblinger for patent infringement.  William H. McIntyre resolved the lawsuit by buying out the Kiblinger partners and forming the W. H. McIntyre Company in December, 1908.

McIntyre 
W. H. McIntyre Company manufactured both buggies and high-wheelers.  A line of two and four-cylinder high-wheelers on a non-patent infringing design, were offered. The McIntyre high-wheeler line of runabouts, tourers and trucks increased until ten different models were available.  By 1911, McIntyre introduced a line of standard vehicles by taking over the 4-cylinder 40-hp America produced by the Motor Car Company (New York City), which was marketed as the McIntyre Special.  The six-cylinder 40-hp McIntyre Limited was added for 1913, but McIntyre was viewed as a high-wheeler manufacturer and these cars did not sell well.

IMP Cyclecar 
In 1913 McIntyre introduced the IMP Cyclecar with a 15 horsepower V-twin engine designed by William Stout . McIntyre IMP's sold for $375, and the sales literature stated that they cost "just a 'penny a mile' to run!"  Although IMP's sold well, over fifty companies had been formed during the "cyclecar craze" and by 1914 sales were ending.

In 1914 McIntyre made a model 4-25 light car based on the IMP but production of all McIntyres soon ended.

Tudhope-McIntyre 
James B. Tudhope of the Tudhope Carriage Companyin Orillia, Ontario formed the Tudhope-McIntyre Company to build high-wheelers in 1908.  Automobile parts were supplied from the W.H. McIntyre Company and the bodies were made by Tudehope's carriage company.Tudhope-McIntyres were priced at $550 CAD and production reached 514 vehicles before a fire in August 1909 destroyed the carriage factory.  Rebuilding from the fire, Tudhope decided to discontinue high-wheeler production and instead acquired a license to build the Everitt 30.

Model Overview, 1907–1915

Fate
With slowing sales, by January 1915 the W. H. McIntyre Company was in receivership.  The DeKalb Manufacturing Company purchased the assets and assembled some cars for another two years.

See also 
 W. H. McIntyre Co - Eckhart Public Library
 1908 Tudehope-McIntyre at the Canadian Automotive Museum
 McIntyre vehicles at ConceptCarz
 1910 McIntyre Model B-1 - Bonhams

References

Defunct motor vehicle manufacturers of the United States
Cyclecars
Motor vehicle manufacturers based in Indiana
1900s cars
1910s cars
Brass Era vehicles
Highwheeler
Cars introduced in 1907
Cars introduced in 1913
Vehicle manufacturing companies established in 1908
Vehicle manufacturing companies disestablished in 1915